The elongate ilisha (the FAO name) (Ilisha elongata), also known as the Chinese herring or slender shad (although not a true herring or shad) ( or simply 鳓, lè), is a species of longfin herring native to the coastal waters and estuaries of North Indian Ocean and Northwest Pacific. It is an important fishery species.

Life history
In the northern part of its range, Ilisha elongata matures at age of 2 years and has a lifespan of about 6 years; in the warmer parts of its range, it matures under age 1 year and has a lifespan of about 3 years. It can spawn several batches of eggs.

Fisheries and use
The species is commercially fished. Based on the FAO fishery statistics, the annual catches ranged between 80,400 and 98,700 tonnes in 2000–2009, all of them from the Northwest Pacific (FAO Fishing Area 61) and almost all of them caught by China. The meat is tasty but has many bones.

References

elongate ilisha
Commercial fish
Fish of China
Fish of Korea
Fish of Malaysia
Fish of Vietnam
Marine fauna of East Asia
Marine fish of Southeast Asia
elongate ilisha